Hororata is a village at the northwestern edge of the Canterbury Plains in the South Island of New Zealand. It is located 15 kilometres southwest of Darfield, five kilometres south of Glentunnel, and 50 kilometres west of Christchurch, on the banks of the Hororata River. Hororata, when translated from Maori means "drooping rata". There are a large number of rata growing in the district.

History 
Hororata developed as a village to service the local farming community. In the early 1900s, the village had all the services that a small town would expect. These include a hotel, a Presbyterian and an Anglican church, stores, a school, post office, flour mill and a brewery. There was a large blacksmiths shop with a total of five forges.

Early European New Zealand pioneer John Studholme and his wife lived at Terrace Station on Milnes Road before selling the run to John Hall. New Zealand 19th century Premier John Hall and his eldest brother George Williamson Hall are buried in the St. John cemetery.

On 4 September 2010, an earthquake struck the surrounding region with a moment magnitude of 7.1 at 4:35 am local time]. It had a maximum perceived intensity of X (Extreme) on the Mercalli intensity scale. The earthquake caused widespread damage and several power outages.

In May 2021, the Hororata Golf Course was damaged by flooding, with it being "largely unrecognisable" as a result. It is thought that it would take weeks to repair the damage caused by the Selwyn river breaching its banks.

Demographics
It is part of the statistical area of Glenroy-Hororata.

Hororata had a population of 204 at the 2018 New Zealand census, an increase of 24 people (13.3%) since the 2013 census, and an increase of 30 people (17.2%) since the 2006 census. There were 75 households. There were 111 males and 93 females, giving a sex ratio of 1.19 males per female. The median age was 38.8 years (compared with 37.4 years nationally), with 42 people (20.6%) aged under 15 years, 36 (17.6%) aged 15 to 29, 96 (47.1%) aged 30 to 64, and 27 (13.2%) aged 65 or older.

Ethnicities were 94.1% European/Pākehā, 11.8% Māori, 1.5% Asian, and 1.5% other ethnicities (totals add to more than 100% since people could identify with multiple ethnicities).

Although some people objected to giving their religion, 64.7% had no religion, 23.5% were Christian and 4.4% had other religions.

Of those at least 15 years old, 12 (7.4%) people had a bachelor or higher degree, and 27 (16.7%) people had no formal qualifications. The median income was $37,700, compared with $31,800 nationally. The employment status of those at least 15 was that 102 (63.0%) people were employed full-time, 21 (13.0%) were part-time, and 3 (1.9%) were unemployed.

Glenroy-Hororata

Glenroy-Hororata had a population of 1,194 at the 2018 New Zealand census, an increase of 108 people (9.9%) since the 2013 census, and an increase of 207 people (21.0%) since the 2006 census. There were 438 households. There were 654 males and 540 females, giving a sex ratio of 1.21 males per female. The median age was 36.9 years (compared with 37.4 years nationally), with 285 people (23.9%) aged under 15 years, 198 (16.6%) aged 15 to 29, 576 (48.2%) aged 30 to 64, and 138 (11.6%) aged 65 or older.

Ethnicities were 86.7% European/Pākehā, 6.3% Māori, 0.3% Pacific peoples, 8.5% Asian, and 3.5% other ethnicities (totals add to more than 100% since people could identify with multiple ethnicities).

The proportion of people born overseas was 18.8%, compared with 27.1% nationally.

Although some people objected to giving their religion, 47.7% had no religion, 40.7% were Christian, 1.0% were Hindu, 0.5% were Muslim, 1.3% were Buddhist and 1.8% had other religions.

Of those at least 15 years old, 180 (19.8%) people had a bachelor or higher degree, and 144 (15.8%) people had no formal qualifications. The median income was $39,700, compared with $31,800 nationally. The employment status of those at least 15 was that 534 (58.7%) people were employed full-time, 171 (18.8%) were part-time, and 18 (2.0%) were unemployed.

Notable buildings

Coton's Cottage 
Originally home to Bentley Coton and his wife Sarah Jane Coton. it was built in approximately 1864. It contains five rooms (including an attic bedroom). It was home to local church services prior to the school taking over this role in 1870. Coton's Cottage suffered partial collapse. It was rebuilt and reopened to the public in March 2014. It had been previously restored by members of the Hororata Historical Society in the 1970s. It currently operates as part of the Hororata Museum  It was listed as a category 2 historic place in 1983.

Hororata Pub 
The Hororata Pub sits across the road from the Hororata Domain. It was built in 1873 by Edwin Derrett with the second story being added at a later date. It was refurbished in 1967. The Hororata pub was closed immediately after the Canterbury earthquakes due to the damage it sustained. It is now a private dwelling.

St John's Church 

Hororata sustained some damage in the 2010 Canterbury earthquake. The settlement's most prominent building, the Anglican church of St. John, was completed in 1911. This was badly affected by the earthquakes with part of its tower collapsed onto the church's roof. The original 1875 wooden church sits across the road from the 1911 structure.

Across the road from the church is Te Waiora Christian Retreat Centre which was rebuilt as a result of the Canterbury earthquakes.

Fairview 
This cob house and cottage were built near Hororata in 1885. They are surrounded by several acres of gardens and a pond. Tours run occasionally of the house and gardens throughout the year.

Terrace Station 
This large farmhouse has a category one registration with Heritage New Zealand. The building started in the  mid-1850s with timber pre-cut from Australia making the first three rooms. Successive rooms were added between 1863 and 1897. The large woolshed, built in 1868, has a category 2 registration from the New Zealand Historic Places Trust. Other farm buildings of note include the managers house and the blacksmiths.

Hororata Highland Games 

The Hororata Highland Games started in 2011. The Hororata community had a  desire to make a positive change following the damage of the Canterbury earthquakes. The annual event has increased in popularity with 10,000 people coming to the 2016 edition. It has become New Zealand's biggest Scottish festival. The event has over 300 competitors turn up each year. Competitions include Highland Dancing, Piping and Drumming, Tug O’ War and Scottish heavy athletics (men's and women's) which include the hammer throw, the sheaf toss, the Hororata stones and tossing the caber. The Kilted mile is a race over a mile which includes eating a Hororata Pie, Drinking a traditional Scottish drink and negotiating a series of obstacles. There are also stalls, food vendors and  a fairground each year.  A study conducted by the University of Canterbury looked at the economic benefits of the Hororata Highland Games. This found that they provided $370,000 to the Selwyn District economy in 2019.

Chieftain 
There is a Chieftain for each games who presides over the opening ceremony. These have included:

 2011: Simon Dallow
 2012: Gerry Brownlee (MP for Ilam, Minister for Christchurch)
 2013: Sir Jerry Mateparae (Governor General)
 2014: Sir Bob Parker  (Mayor of Christchurch)
 2015: Alex Bruce (Director of Adelphi Distillery, Scotland)
 2016: Kyle Warren (Bagpipe musician)
 2017: Amy Adams (MP for Selwyn)
 2018: Patrick Hellier (Highland Games Heavy athlete)
 2019: Peri Drysdale
 2020: John de Vries
 2022: Kate Foster (Local Historian)

Hororata tartan 
Hororata has its own tartan which was created to celebrate the inaugural Hororata Highland Games. The Scottish Tartans Authority donated the design and the first 30 metres of cloth to Hororata. The tartan includes six colours all of which have local meanings: The red represents the colour of the rata flower. The white is the snow and the blue the local rivers of the area. The green is for the grass and Pounamu. Finally the three local schools colours were included: black and yellow (Hororata School), black and blue (Glentunnel School) and white and green (Windwhistle School).

Hororata Night Glow 
The Hororata Night Glow is an annual event held in winter. Hot air balloons light up in the evening and light up the night sky. The event is held at the Hororata Domain. The Hororata Highland Games and the Hororata Night Glow were successful in bringing approximately 25,000 people to Hororata in 2019.

Climate 
The warmest months of the year are January and February, with an average high temperature of 22 °C. The coldest month of the year occurs in July, when the average high temperature is 10 °C. Monthly rainfall ranges between an average of 35mm in January to 62mm in July.

Education 
The original Hororata school was located on the corner or Downs Road and Hororata Road and built in 1870. It was completely destroyed by fire on 17 February 1914. Hororata Primary School is Hororata's sole primary school. This was built on Bealey Road. The buildings were expanded significantly in 1952 and a further classroom was added in 1963 when the Te Pirita and Hororata schools were amalgamated.

Government 
Hororata is part of the  electorate. The Selwyn District Council provides local government services to Hororata.

Recreation 
Hororata has a domain, which includes duck ponds and a picnic area. It was established in 1877 thanks to the generousity of local land owners. A tennis court and a Scouts building are located in the domain as well. Large expansive fields are located there, which are primarily used for the Hororata Highland Games and the Hororata Night Glow. A horse riding track, a tennis court, a Scouts building, are also located in the domain. A walking track links the domain to St John's Church. Ice skating used to occur on the Edwardian lake at the Hororata Domain.

Services 
Hororata has a café and bar, petrol station and a fire station. Hororata also has a community centre where it houses a clothing shop.

References

External links

 Photo album showing earthquake damage in Hororata

Selwyn District
Populated places in Canterbury, New Zealand